The Proud is an epithet which may refer to:

Henry X, Duke of Bavaria (c. 1108–1139), also Duke of Saxony (as Henry II) and Margrave of Tuscany
Lucius Tarquinius Superbus (535–496 BC), legendary seventh and final King of Rome
Simeon of Moscow (1316-1353), Prince of Moscow and Grand Prince of Vladimir
Tovi the Proud, a rich and powerful 11th-century Danish thegn with estates in southern England

See also
Charles Seymour, 6th Duke of Somerset (1662-1748), the "Proud Duke"

Lists of people by epithet